Hans Knauß (born 9 February 1971 in Schladming) is an Austrian former alpine skier.  He competed at the 1994, 1998 and 2002 Winter Olympics, winning a silver medal in the Super-G at the 1998 Nagano Olympics. Knauß tested positive for the anabolic steroid Nandrolone at a World Cup downhill in Canada on 27 November 2004 and was given an 18-month ban from sport.

Doping ban 
Knauß tested positive for the anabolic steroid Nandrolone at a World Cup downhill in Lake Louise in Canada on 27 November 2004 and was subsequently given an 18-month ban from sport. Knauß retired from the sport after the doping sanction.

World Cup victories

References

External links
 

1971 births
Living people
Austrian male alpine skiers
Austrian sportspeople in doping cases
Doping cases in alpine skiing
Alpine skiers at the 1994 Winter Olympics
Alpine skiers at the 1998 Winter Olympics
Alpine skiers at the 2002 Winter Olympics
Olympic alpine skiers of Austria
Olympic silver medalists for Austria
Olympic medalists in alpine skiing
Medalists at the 1998 Winter Olympics
People from Liezen District
Sportspeople from Styria